Brute or The Brute may refer to:

People 

 Brute, a pseudonym of English commercial artist Aidan Hughes (born 1956)
 "Brute", nickname of US Marine Corps Lieutenant General Victor H. Krulak (1913–2008)
 Brute Bernard, ring name of Canadian wrestler Jim Bernard (1921–1984)
 Simon Bruté (1779–1839), missionary and first bishop of the Diocese of Vincennes, Indiana
 Brutus, the cognomen of an Ancient Roman family whose vocative form is "Brute"
 Bill "The Brute" Sanger, a member of the Cherry Hill Gang, a late nineteenth century New York City street gang
 The Brute (wrestler), ring name of professional wrestler John Czawlytko in the early 1990s
 "The Brute", nickname of American jazz tenor saxophonist Ben Webster (1909–1973)
 Marcus Junius Brutus the Younger, a Roman politician and one of Julius Caesar's assassins

Arts, entertainment, and media 

 BRUTE!, a magazine published by English artist Aidan Hughes who also occasionally uses "Brute" as pseudonym
 Et tu, Brute?, famous statement by Julius Caesar to Marcus Junius Brutus the Younger, in Shakespeare's play Julius Caesar
 "The Brute", a short story by Joseph Conrad

Fictional or mythological entities 
 Brute (comics), various characters
 Brute or Brutus of Troy, a legendary descendant of the Trojan hero Æneas, in mediæval British legend the founder and first king of Britain
 Brutes (Halo), an alien race in the Halo video game franchise

Films 
 The Brute (1914 film), a lost early silent feature film
 The Brute (1920 film), an American film produced for African-American audiences by director Oscar Micheaux
 The Brute (1927 film), a lost silent American Western film
 La Brute (1921), a French film directed by Daniel Bompard
 El Bruto (1953), a Mexican drama film directed by Luis Buñuel
 The Brute (1961 film), a Hungarian production directed by Zoltán Fábri
 The Brute (1977), a British film directed by Gerry O'Hara

Music 

 Brute (band), a side project band of guitarist Vic Chesnutt and members of blues-rock band Widespread Panic
 Brute (album), a 2016 protest album by Kuwait musician Fatima Al Qadiri
 "Brute" (song), a single from 1995 album, Nihil, by Hamburg-based, German industrial rock/metal group KMFDM

Transportation 

AEV Brute, a compact pickup truck in production since 2011
 British Rail Universal Trolley Equipment (BRUTE), trolleys used from 1964 until 1999

See also 

 Brute force (disambiguation)
 Bruting

Lists of people by nickname
Nicknames